Pierre Louis Vasquez also known as Luis Vázquez (October 3, 1798 – September 5, 1868) was a mountain man and trader. He was a contemporary of many famous European-American explorers of the early west and would come to know many of them, including Jim Bridger, Manuel Lisa, Kit Carson and Andrew Sublette, besides his own father Benito Vázquez.

Family and early life
Louis was born and raised at St. Louis, Missouri. He was the son of the Spanish fur trader Benito Vázquez and Marie-Julie Papin (daughter of Pierre Papin & Catherine Guichard), so was of Spanish and French Canadian (European) descent. In 1823, he became a fur trader, receiving his first license to trade with the Pawnee. By the early 1830s he had shifted his operations to the mountains, becoming a popular and active mountain man and trader. Having been educated by the priests at the St. Louis Cathedral, he was one of the few mountain men that was literate. Although he signed all of his letters, as "Louis", Pierre Louis was nicknamed "Old Vaskiss" by other Mountain men. Louis was the youngest of eleven brothers.

Noted activities
In 1834, Louis Vasquez became a partner of Andrew Sublette and went back to trade on the South Platte after obtaining a trading license in St. Louis, Missouri, from William Clark, the Superintendent of Indian Affairs. In 1835 he built Fort Vasquez. He traveled back and forth between the mountains and St. Louis almost yearly, his reputation growing. Unable to turn a profit, they sold Fort Vasquez to Lock and Randolph in 1840, who subsequently went bankrupt and abandoned the structure in 1842. Due to the bankruptcy, Louis Vasquez and Andrew Sublette could not collect the sum owed to them for the sale. Vasquez then became associated with Jim Bridger. By 1843 they had built Fort Bridger on Blacks Fork of the Green River, which became as much an emigrant station as trading post. 

At St. Louis in 1846 Vasquez married a widow, Mrs. Narcissa Land Ashcraft and took his new family, her son and daughter, to Fort Bridger in Wyoming. There they had three more children; Louis, Marianne and Sara.   Vasquez opened a store at Salt Lake City in 1855. He and Bridger sold their fort in 1858, but Vasquez already had retired to Missouri. In 1868 he died at his Westport home, and was buried at St. Mary's Church cemetery. Years before, in 1853, Louis Vasquez gave to his good friend Jim Bridger his own rifle as a gift. From 1998 the rifle is shown at the Museum of the Mountain Man at Pinedale, Wyoming.

References

1798 births
1868 deaths
Mountain men
People of Colonial Spanish Louisiana
People of pre-statehood Missouri
People from St. Louis
American people of Spanish descent